Lukáš Fabiš (born 5 May 1998) is a Slovak footballer who plays for Ružomberok as a defender.

Club career

FC Nitra
Fabiš made his Fortuna Liga debut for Nitra against Senica on 18 November 2017. Fabiš played 90 minutes of the goal-less game.

References

External links
 FC Nitra official club profile
 
 Futbalnet profile
 

1998 births
Living people
Sportspeople from Nitra
Slovak footballers
Slovakia under-21 international footballers
Association football defenders
FC Nitra players
MFK Ružomberok players
4. Liga (Slovakia) players
3. Liga (Slovakia) players
Slovak Super Liga players